Diario VEA is a daily newspaper in Venezuela. It was founded in Caracas in 2003. It is owned by the government. Its slogan is Comprometidos con Venezuela ("Committed to Venezuela"). Its director is Guillermo García Ponce. It comes in a tabloid format. It has been described as "the mouthpiece of the Bolivarian Revolution".

Politics 
Ideologically Diario VEA is on the left side of the political spectrum, and as a result of its ownership by the state, it is much friendlier to President Hugo Chávez than most of  Venezuela's dailies; hence its editorial line is critical of the United States and the Venezuelan opposition, as well as the Colombian government.

See also 
 List of newspapers in Venezuela

References

External links 
Diario VEA on-line

Spanish-language newspapers
Newspapers published in Venezuela
Mass media in Caracas